William Morris (1811 – 25 February 1877) was a British Liberal Party politician and banker.

Morris was active in the public life of Carmarthen for many years before his election to Parliament and served as mayor of the borough on four occasions.

Morris was elected MP for Carmarthen Boroughs at a by-election in 1864, after his cousin David Morris died in office. Although there was speculation about several other possible candidates, requisitions inviting Morris to fill the vacancy appeared almost immediately after the former member's funeral.

He then held the seat until 1868 when he did not stand for re-election.

Morris also served as a Justice of the Peace for Carmarthenshire and Carmarthen, and a High Sheriff of Carmarthenshire in 1858.

Morris remained active in local government and became a member of the Carmarthen School Board. He died in February 1877.

References

External links
 

Liberal Party (UK) MPs for Welsh constituencies
High Sheriffs of Carmarthenshire
UK MPs 1859–1865
UK MPs 1865–1868
1811 births
1877 deaths